Kira Isabella Wilkie, who is known by her stage name Kira Isabella is a Canadian country music artist. Isabella was signed to Sony Music Canada in 2009. Her first single, "Love Me Like That", was released in 2011 and charted on the Canadian Hot 100. Isabella released her second single in 2011 entitled "A Real Good Radio". Her third single, "A Little More Work", was released in 2012. Her debut studio album, Love Me Like That, was released in October 2012, and produced two further singles. Kira Isabella announced dates for a 2013 Canadian tour with Terri Clark in October 2012 and Carrie Underwood in December 2012. In 2013, Isabella signed with U.S. record label HitShop Records. The lead single from her forthcoming second album, "Quarterback", was released in spring 2014.

Early life

Kira Isabella began singing and playing the guitar at 7 years old, under the tutelage of her father and her singing teacher Trina Langthorne. Her ethnic background is Colombian. She was inspired by fellow Canadian country singer Shania Twain and her then recent album, Up!, to enter the country music industry. Her songwriting began development through writing poetry, beginning in the fourth grade. At the age of 14, Kira Isabella won the Rising Star Award in the Female Open Category of a Blyth, Ontario, arts festival. The consequential media exposure that led well-known music producers to Kira Isabella would help launch her career as a country singer.

Influences

Female country singers such as Faith Hill, Sheryl Crow, Shania Twain and Taylor Swift have been cited by Kira Isabella as strong musical influences.

Tours and festivals

To date, Kira Isabella has performed as a guest singer on two tours. From October to December 2012, she has worked with Carrie Underwood on her Blown Away Tour and in 2013, with Terri Clark. She will have performed in the Boots and Hearts Music Festival line-up for two years consecutively by August 2013. Her first headlining show was June 30, 2013 in Calabogie, Ontario at the Calabogie Country Music Fest. She also performed at the free biweekly Peterborough Musicfest on July 31, 2013.

Discography

Studio albums

Extended plays

Singles

Featured singles

Christmas singles

Music videos

Awards

|-
| 2016
| Kira Isabella
| Canadian Country Music Association Female Artist of the Year
| 
|-
| rowspan="2"| 2015
| Kira Isabella
| Canadian Country Music Association Female Artist of the Year
| 
|-
| Caffeine & Big Dreams
| Juno Award for Country Album of the Year 
| 
|-
| 2014
| Kira Isabella
| Canadian Country Music Association Female Artist of the Year
| 
|-
| rowspan="3"| 2013
| Kira Isabella
| Canadian Country Music Association Female Artist of the Year
| 
|-
| "A Little More Work"
| Canadian Country Music Association CMT Video of the Year
| 
|-
| Kira Isabella
| Juno Award for Breakthrough Artist of the Year 
| 
|-
| 2012
| Kira Isabella
| Canadian Country Music Association Rising Star Award 
| 
|-
| 2017
|"That's When You Know" (with Chris Buck Band)
| Canadian Country Music Association Video of the Year  
| 
|}

References

External links

Canadian women country singers
Canadian country singer-songwriters
Living people
Musicians from Ottawa
Canadian people of Colombian descent
1993 births
Canadian Country Music Association Female Artist of the Year winners
Canadian Country Music Association Rising Star Award winners
21st-century Canadian women singers
Canadian women singer-songwriters